Uppi Dada M.B.B.S. is a 2006 Indian Kannada-language comedy drama film directed by D. Rajendra Babu. It is a remake of the Hindi film Munna Bhai M.B.B.S.. The film stars Upendra, Uma and Anant Nag. The music is composed by R. P. Patnaik.

Cast
 Upendra as Rao Bahaddur Upendra Rao / Uppi Dada
 Chi Guru Dutt as Circuit
 Uma as Dr. Uma / Chinnu
 Anant Nag as Dr. Ashok Kashyap
 Srinath as Bahaddur Rajashekhar Rao, Upendra Rao's Father
 Sumithra as Upendra Rao's Mother
 Dattanna as Cleaner 
 Chitra Shenoy
 Naveen Mayur - Cancer patient
 Narendra Babu Sharma- Compounder
Sanketh Kashi as Dr. Kashinath 
Prithviraj 
Shankar Bhat 
Bank Janardhan 
Dileep Kumar 
Shankar Rao 
G. R. Ramdas

Soundtrack
The soundtrack was composed by R. P. Patnaik

References

2000s Kannada-language films
2006 films
Kannada remakes of Hindi films
Indian comedy-drama films
Medical-themed films
2006 comedy-drama films
2006 comedy films
2006 drama films
Films directed by D. Rajendra Babu